The elongate smooth-head (Conocara microlepis), also called the elongate slickhead, is a species of fish in the family Alepocephalidae.

Description
The elongate smooth-head is brownish in colour; its premaxillae form a sharp plate-like 'visor'.

Habitat

Its specific name microlepis means "small scale."

References

Alepocephalidae
Fish described in 1909
Taxa named by Richard Ernest Lloyd